Sir Francis Stanley Jackson  (21 November 1870 – 9 March 1947), known as the Honourable Stanley Jackson during his playing career, was an English cricketer, soldier and Conservative Party politician. He played in 20 Test matches for the England cricket team between 1893 and 1905.

Early life
Jackson was born in Leeds. His father was William Jackson, 1st Baron Allerton.  During Stanley's time at Harrow School his fag was fellow parliamentarian and future Prime Minister Winston Churchill. He went up to Trinity College, Cambridge in 1889.

Cricket career 

Jackson played for Cambridge University, Yorkshire and England. He spotted the talent of Ranjitsinhji when the latter, owing to his unorthodox batting and his race, was struggling to find a place for himself in the university side, and as captain was responsible for Ranji's inclusion in the Cambridge First XI and the awarding of his Blue. According to Alan Gibson this was "a much more controversial thing to do than would seem possible to us now". He was named a Wisden Cricketer of the Year in 1894.

He captained England in five Test matches in 1905, winning two and drawing three to retain The Ashes. Captaining England for the first time, he won all five tosses and topped the batting and bowling averages for both sides, with 492 runs at 70.28 and 13 wickets at 15.46.  These were the last of his 20 Test matches, all played at home as he could not spare the time to tour. Jackson still holds the Test record for the most matches in a career without playing away from home.

An orthodox batsman with a penchant for forcing strokes in front of square on both sides of the wicket he was regarded as a very sound player of fast bowling. His own bowling was a brisk fast medium, with a good off cutter his main weapon. While his commitments outside of cricket limited the number of games he played he was a key member of the very strong Yorkshire sides who won 6 county championships during his career (although this did include 1901 when Jackson did not appear in the county championship). His performances in 1896 and 1898 in particular showed what his statistics could have been if he had been able to dedicate more time, scoring over 1,000 championship runs at better than 40.00 in each season and taking over 100 wickets across the two seasons at an average of under 20.

He was also the first batsman to be dismissed for nervous 90's on test debut.

Gibson wrote of him as a cricketer that he had "a toughness of character, a certain ruthlessness behind the genial exterior... He does not seem to have been a particularly popular man, though he was always a deeply respected one."

He was President of the Marylebone Cricket Club (MCC) in 1921.

Jackson succeeded Lord Hawke as President of Yorkshire County Cricket Club in 1938 after Hawke's death and held the post until his own death in 1947.

Military and political career 
Jackson was a lieutenant in the Harrow Volunteers when he was on 16 January 1900 appointed captain in 3rd (Militia) Battalion of the King's Own (Royal Lancaster Regiment). He left with his battalion in February 1900 to serve in the Second Boer War, and arrived in South Africa the following month. He transferred to the West Yorkshire Regiment as a Lieutenant-Colonel in 1914.

He was elected as a Member of Parliament at a by-election in February 1915, representing Howdenshire (Yorkshire) until resigning his seat on 3 November 1926. He served as Financial Secretary to the War Office 1922–23. In 1927 he was appointed Governor of Bengal and in that year was knighted with the GCIE and was made a member of the Privy Council. In 1928 while he was Governor of Bengal, he inaugurated The Malda District Central Co-operative Bank Ltd in Malda District of Bengal to promote co-operative movements. He was awarded the KStJ in 1932.

On 6 February 1932, Jackson sidestepped and ducked five pistol shots fired at close range by a girl student named Bina Das in the Convocation Hall of the University of Calcutta. Escaping unharmed and smiling, "[e]ven before the smoke had blown away, the Governor resumed his speech amid cheers." The attacker was tackled and disarmed by Lieutenant-Colonel Hassan Suhrawardy (the first Muslim vice chancellor of the University of Calcutta), who was knighted by the King for his heroism.  Later that year, Jackson was appointed GCSI.

Family
Jackson married at St. Helen's Church, Welton, East Yorkshire, on 5 November 1902 to Miss Harrison-Broadley, daughter of Mr. and Mrs. Harrison-Broadley, of Welton-House, Brough, Yorkshire.

Funeral 

Jackson died in London of complications following a road accident.  Recalling his funeral, the Bishop of Knaresborough remarked "As I gazed down on the rapt faces of that vast congregation, I could see how they revered him as though he were the Almighty, though, of course, infinitely stronger on the leg side."

See also
History of Test cricket (1890 to 1900)

References

Bibliography

External links 

 
 
 

1870 births
1947 deaths
Road incident deaths in London
Cricketers from Leeds
West Yorkshire Regiment officers
King's Own Royal Regiment officers
British Militia officers
British Army personnel of the Second Boer War
British Army personnel of World War I
Alumni of Trinity College, Cambridge
Cambridge University cricketers
Deputy Lieutenants of the West Riding of Yorkshire
England Test cricketers
England Test cricket captains
Presidents of the Marylebone Cricket Club
Wisden Cricketers of the Year
Wisden Leading Cricketers in the World
Yorkshire cricketers
Conservative Party (UK) MPs for English constituencies
British sportsperson-politicians
Members of the Privy Council of the United Kingdom
British governors of Bengal
Knights Grand Commander of the Order of the Star of India
Knights Grand Commander of the Order of the Indian Empire
Knights of the Order of St John
UK MPs 1910–1918
UK MPs 1918–1922
UK MPs 1922–1923
UK MPs 1923–1924
UK MPs 1924–1929
Younger sons of barons
English cricketers
England cricket team selectors
English cricketers of 1890 to 1918
Gentlemen cricketers
Chairmen of the Conservative Party (UK)
Marylebone Cricket Club cricketers
Gentlemen of England cricketers
Presidents of Yorkshire County Cricket Club
Lord Hawke's XI cricketers
C. I. Thornton's XI cricketers
North v South cricketers
A. J. Webbe's XI cricketers
People educated at Harrow School
Military personnel from Leeds